The Lost Salt Gift of Blood is a collection of short stories by Canadian author Alistair MacLeod. It was originally published in 1976. All of the stories contained in the collection were later republished in the book Island, along with the stories from his collection As Birds Bring Forth the Sun and Other Stories.

According to the blurb of the book;
"The evocative and haunting collection is set Cape Breton Island, Nova Scotia and in Newfoundland, a remote region where Gaelic is still spoken, old legends live on, and the same cold sea that washes the Hebrides beats against the granite cliffs. With a tearing lyricism, The Lost Salt Gift of Blood lays bare the joys, the fears, the darkness, and the shining hope of communities whose isolation is at once a curse and a blessing."

The style of the writing contained in the book is such that the descriptions of the people, their thoughts, fears and eccentricities, as well as the detailed and warm descriptions of the events in the book are the main focus, rather than the events themselves having any complexity.

A 1994 translation of the book into French by Florence Bernard, titled Cet heritage au gout de sel, won the John Glassco Translation Prize in 1995.

Stories
 "In the Fall"
 "The Vastness of the Dark"
 "The Lost Salt Gift of Blood"
 "The Return"
 "The Golden Gift of Grey"
 "The Boat"
 "The Road to Rankin's Point"

External links 
 Detailed Review and Analysis - Studies in Canadian Literature

1976 short story collections
New Canadian Library
Short story collections by Alistair MacLeod
McClelland & Stewart books